Patrick Meyer may refer to:

 Canadian Green Party candidate for the federal election of 2008 in Langley
 A German-speaking Belgian politician, member of the CSP, in the Parliament of the German-speaking Community as of 2010

See also
 Patrick DeMeyer, Belgian songwriter, composer and producer
 Patrick Mayer (disambiguation)